The 2003 season was the 11th season since the establishment of the J.League. The league began on March 15 and ended on November 29.

General

Promotion and relegation 
 At the end of the 2002 Season, Oita Trinita and Cerezo Osaka were promoted to division 1.
 At the end of the 2002 Season, Sanfrecce Hiroshima and Consadole Sapporo were relegated to division 2.

Changes in competition formats 
 Extra time was scratched for J.League Division 1. After regulation time, clubs now receives 3pts for a win, 1pt for a tie, and 0pts for a loss.

Changes in clubs 
none

Honours

Clubs 

Following sixteen clubs participated in J.League Division 1 during 2003 season. Of these clubs, Oita Trinita and Cerezo Osaka were newly promoted from Division 2.

 Vegalta Sendai 
 Kashima Antlers
 Urawa Red Diamonds
 JEF United Ichihara
 Kashiwa Reysol
 FC Tokyo
 Tokyo Verdy 1969
 Yokohama F. Marinos
 Shimizu S-Pulse
 Jublio Iwata
 Nagoya Grampus Eight
 Kyoto Purple Sanga
 Gamba Osaka
 Cerezo Osaka 
 Vissel Kobe
 Oita Trinita

Format 
In the 2003 season, the league was conducted split-season format, 1st Stage and 2nd Stage. In each stage, sixteen clubs played in a single round-robin format, a total of 15 games per club (per stage). A club received 3 points for a win, 1 point for a tie, and 0 points for a loss. The clubs were ranked by points, and tie breakers are, in the following order:
 Goal differential 
 Goals scored 
 Head-to-head results
A draw would be conducted, if necessary. The club that finished at the top of the table is declared stage champion and qualifies for the Suntory Championship. The first stage winner, hosts the first leg in the championship series.  If a single club wins both stages, the club is declared the season champions and championship series will not be held. Two bottom-placed clubs are relegated to J2.

Changes in Competition Format
 Extra time was abandoned, now every regular season game ends after 90 minutes.

First stage

Table

Results

Second stage

Table

Results

Suntory Championship 
In 2003, Suntory Championship was again not held because Yokohama F. Marinos had won both the first and the second stage and thus were automatically declared 2003 J.League Champions.

Overall table

Top scorers

Attendance figures

Awards

Individual

Best Eleven 
{| class="wikitable" style="font-size: 95%;"
|-
!Position!!Footballer!!Club!!Nationality
|-
|GK||Seigo Narazaki (3)||Nagoya Grampus Eight||
|-
|DF||Keisuke Tsuboi (1)||Urawa Red Diamonds||
|-
|DF||Dutra (1)||Yokohama F. Marinos||
|-
|DF||Yuji Nakazawa (2)||Yokohama F. Marinos||
|-
|MF||Mitsuo Ogasawara (3)||Kashima Antlers||
|-
|MF||Takashi Fukunishi (4)||Júbilo Iwata||
|-
|MF||Daisuke Oku (2)||Yokohama F. Marinos||
|-
|MF||Yasuhito Endō (1)||Gamba Osaka||
|-
|FW||Emerson Sheik (2)||Urawa Red Diamonds||
|-
|FW||Ueslei (1)||Nagoya Grampus Eight||
|-
|FW
|Tatsuhiko Kubo (1)||Yokohama F. Marinos||

* The number in brackets denotes the number of times that the footballer has appeared in the Best 11.

References

External links 
 J. League Official Stats
 rsssf.com

J1 League seasons
1
Japan
Japan